The following outline is provided as an overview of and topical guide to geophysics:

Geophysics – the physics of the Earth and its environment in space; also the study of the Earth using quantitative physical methods. The term geophysics sometimes refers only to the geological applications: Earth's shape; its gravitational and magnetic fields; its internal structure and composition; its dynamics and their surface expression in plate tectonics,  the generation of magmas, volcanism and rock formation. However, modern geophysics organizations have a broader definition that includes the hydrological cycle including snow and ice; fluid dynamics of the oceans and the atmosphere; electricity and magnetism in the ionosphere and magnetosphere and solar-terrestrial relations; and analogous problems associated with the Moon and other planets.

Nature of geophysics 

Geophysics can be described as all of the following:

 An academic discipline – branch of knowledge that is taught and researched at the college or university level. Disciplines are defined (in part), and recognized by the academic journals in which research is published, and the learned societies and academic departments or faculties to which their practitioners belong.
 A scientific field (a branch of science) – widely recognized category of specialized expertise within science, and typically embodies its own terminology and nomenclature. Such a field will usually be represented by one or more scientific journals, where peer-reviewed research is published. There are several geophysics-related scientific journals.
 A natural science – one that seeks to elucidate the rules that govern the natural world using empirical and scientific methods.
 A physical science – one that studies non-living systems.
 An earth science – one that studies the planet Earth and its surroundings.
 A biological science – one that studies the effect of organisms on their physical environment.
 An interdisciplinary field – one that overlaps atmospheric sciences, geology, glaciology, hydrology, oceanography and physics.

Branches of geophysics 
Biogeophysics – study of how plants, microbial activity and other organisms alter geologic materials and affect geophysical signatures.
Exploration geophysics – the use of surface methods to detect concentrations of ore minerals and hydrocarbons.
Geophysical fluid dynamics – study of naturally occurring, large-scale flows on Earth and other planets.
Geodesy – measurement and representation of the Earth, including its gravitational field.
Geodynamics – study of modes of transport deformation within the Earth: rock deformation, mantle convection, heat flow, and lithosphere dynamics.
Geomagnetism – study of the Earth's magnetic field, including its origin, telluric currents driven by the magnetic field, the Van Allen belts, and the interaction between the magnetosphere and the solar wind.
Mathematical geophysics – development and applications of mathematical methods and techniques for the solution of geophysical problems.
Mineral physics – science of materials that compose the interior of planets, particularly the Earth.
Near-surface geophysics – the use of geophysical methods to investigate small-scale features in the shallow (tens of meters) subsurface.
Paleomagnetism – measurement of the orientation of the Earth's magnetic field over the geologic past.
Seismology – study of the structure and composition of the Earth through seismic waves, and of surface deformations during earthquakes and seismic hazards.
Tectonophysics – study of the physical processes that cause and result from plate tectonics.

History of geophysics 

History of geophysics
History of geomagnetism
Timeline of the development of tectonophysics
Vine–Matthews–Morley hypothesis

General geophysics concepts

Gravity 

Gravity of Earth
 Bouguer anomaly
 Isostatic gravity anomaly
 Geoid
 Geopotential
 Gravity anomaly
 Undulation of the geoid

Heat flow 

Geothermal gradient
 Internal heating

Electricity

Atmospheric electricity 

Atmospheric electricity
 Lightning
 Sprite (lightning)

Electricity in Earth
 Electrical resistivity tomography
 Induced polarization
 Seismoelectrical method
 Spectral induced polarisation
 Spontaneous potential
 Telluric current

Electromagnetic waves 
 Alfvén wave
 Dawn chorus (electromagnetic)
 Hiss (electromagnetic)
 Magnetotellurics
 Seismo-electromagnetics
 Transient electromagnetics
 Whistler (radio)

Fluid dynamics 

Geophysical fluid dynamics
 Isostasy
 Post-glacial rebound
 Mantle convection
 Geodynamo

Magnetism

Geomagnetism subfields 
 Environmental magnetism
 Magnetostratigraphy
 Paleomagnetism
 Rock magnetism

Earth's magnetic field

Description 
 Geomagnetic pole
 Magnetic declination
 Magnetic inclination
 North Magnetic Pole
 South Magnetic Pole

Sources 
 Geodynamo
 Magnetic anomaly
 Magnetosphere

Short-term changes 
 Secular variation
 Geomagnetic secular variation
 Geomagnetic jerk

Long term behavior 
 Apparent polar wander
 Geomagnetic excursion
 Geomagnetic pole
 Geomagnetic reversal
 Geomagnetic secular variation
 Polar wander
 True polar wander

Magnetostratigraphy 
 Archaeomagnetic dating
 Polarity chron
 Magnetostratigraphy
 Superchron (currently redirected to Geomagnetic reversal#Moyero Reversed Superchron)

Rock magnetism 

Rock magnetism
 Magnetic mineralogy
 Natural remanent magnetization
 Saturation isothermal remanence
 Thermoremanent magnetization
 Viscous remanent magnetization

Tectonic applications 
 Plate reconstruction

Magnetic survey 
 Aeromagnetic survey
 Geophysical survey
 Magnetic survey (archaeology)
 Magnetometer

Radioactivity 
 Age of the Earth
 Geochronology
 Radiometric dating

Mineral physics 

Mineral physics
 Creep
 Elasticity
 Melting
 Rheology
 Thermal expansion
 Viscosity

Vibration 

Seismology
 Earthquake – a motion that causes seismic waves.
Aftershock – follows larger earthquake.
Blind thrust – along a thrust fault that does not show on the Earth's surface.
Foreshock – precedes larger earthquake.
Harmonic tremor – long-duration, with distinct frequencies, associated with a volcanic eruption.
Interplate – at the boundary between two tectonic plates.
Intraplate – in the interior of a tectonic plate.
Megathrust – at subduction zones
Remotely triggered earthquakes – after main shock but outside the aftershock zone.
Slow – over a period of hours to months.
Submarine – under a body of water.
Supershear – rupture propagates faster than seismic shear wave velocity.
Tsunami – triggers a tsunami.
 Seismic waves
P
S
Surface
Love
Raleigh
 Reflection seismology
 Seismic refraction
 Seismic tomography
 Structure of the Earth

Closely allied sciences

Atmospheric sciences

Atmospheric sciences
 Aeronomy – the study of the physical structure and chemistry of the atmosphere.
 Meteorology – the study of weather processes and forecasting.
 Climatology – the study of weather conditions averaged over a period of time.

Geology

Geology
 Mineralogy – the study of chemistry, crystal structure, and physical (including optical) properties of minerals.
 Petrophysics  – The study of the origin, structure, and composition of rocks.
 Volcanology – the study of volcanoes, volcanic features (hot springs, geysers, fumaroles), volcanic rock, and heat flow related to volcanoes.

Engineering
 Geophysical engineering – the application of geophysics to the engineering design of facilities including roads, tunnels, and mines.

Water on the Earth
 Glaciology – the study of ice and natural phenomena that involve ice, particularly glaciers.
 Hydrology – the study of the movement, distribution, and quality of water on Earth and other planets.
 Physical oceanography – the study of physical conditions and physical processes within the ocean, especially the motions and physical properties of ocean waters.

Society

Influential persons 

List of geophysicists

Organizations 
 American Geophysical Union
 Canadian Geophysical Union
 Environmental and Engineering Geophysical Society
 European Association of Geoscientists and Engineers
 European Geosciences Union
 International Union of Geodesy and Geophysics
 Royal Astronomical Society
 Society of Exploration Geophysicists
 Seismological Society of America

Publications 
 Geophysics journals
 Important publications in geophysics (geology)
 Important publications in geophysics (physics)

Geophysics lists

See also 

Outline of geology
Outline of physics

External links 

geophysics
geophysics